The 2002 Girabola was the 24th season of top-tier football competition in Angola. The season ran from 23 February to 20 October 2002. Petro de Luanda were the defending champions.

The league comprised 14 teams, the bottom three of which were relegated to the 2003 Gira Angola.

ASA were crowned champions, winning their first title, while Benfica do Lubango, Futebol Clube de Cabinda and Sporting do Bié, were relegated.

Flávio Amado of Petro de Luanda finished as the top scorer with 16 goals.

Changes from the 2001 season
Relegated: Bravos do Maquis, Primeiro de Maio and Progresso do Sambizanga
Promoted: Desportivo da Huíla, Sporting de Cabinda and Sporting do Bié

League table

Results

Season statistics

Top scorers 

* Less matches played

References

External links
Girabola 2002 standings at girabola.com
Federação Angolana de Futebol

2002 in Angolan football
Girabola seasons
Angola
Angola